Langham Booth (c. 1684 – 12 May 1724) was an English courtier and member of parliament. 

A younger son of Henry Booth, 1st Earl of Warrington and his wife Mary Langham, in 1705 Booth was elected as a Whig as one of the two Members of Parliament for Cheshire and sat until 1710, in 1707 becoming one of the members of the First Parliament of Great Britain. He was elected again for the parliament of 1715 to 1722.

In 1723, Booth was returned as one of the members for Liverpool, but died only a year later, when he was reported to be aged forty.

He was also a Groom of the Bedchamber to King George I.

Notes

1680s births
1724 deaths
Members of the Parliament of England (pre-1707)
Members of the Parliament of Great Britain for English constituencies
Members of the Parliament of Great Britain for Liverpool
British MPs 1707–1708
British MPs 1708–1710
British MPs 1710–1713
British MPs 1713–1715
British MPs 1715–1722